Elena Laumenskienė (16 July 1880 – 24 March 1960) was a Lithuanian composer, music educator, and pianist who published some music under the name Elena Stanekaite-Laumyanskene. 

Laumyanskene was born in Radviliškis. She graduated from the Moscow Conservatory in 1907, where her teachers included Alexander Ilyinsky, Konstantin Igumnov, and Alexander Scriabin. She married Laumenskis. 

Laumenskienė taught piano in Vilnius and Moscow. She founded the Lithuanian National Conservatory in Kaunas in 1930, managing it for the next decade. In 1940, she began teaching at the Vilnius Conservatory. During this time, she presented piano recitals in Kaunas, Moscow, and Vilnius. Her compositions were recorded commercially by Melodija (MELOD D 009587/8). She died in Vilnius.

Works
Laumenskienė's compositions included:

Chamber 
Mazurka (violin and piano)
Memories (violin and piano)
Romance (violin and piano)
Tarantella (violin and piano)

Piano 
more than 200 works (preludes, miniatures, children’s pieces)

Vocal 
approximately 100 songs in Lithuanian
“Evening”
“I was Sad in the Night”
“It is Good for Your Heart”

References 

Lithuanian composers
Women composers
Music educators
Composers for piano
Lithuanian pianists
1880 births
1960 deaths
Moscow Conservatory alumni
Composers for violin